Menzi Banele Ndwandwe (born 1 July 1997) is a South African footballer who plays as a midfielder for the All Stars.

At the youth international level he played in the 2016 COSAFA U-20 Cup.

Career statistics

Club

Notes

References

1997 births
Living people
Sportspeople from Durban
South Africa under-20 international soccer players
South African soccer players
Association football forwards
National First Division players
AmaZulu F.C. players
Uthongathi F.C. players
Bloemfontein Celtic F.C. players
Royal AM F.C. players
TS Galaxy F.C. players